USS Lenah Sutcliffe Higbee (DDG-123) is a United States Navy  Flight IIA guided missile destroyer, the 73rd overall for the class. She is named for Chief Nurse Lenah H. Sutcliffe Higbee (1874–1941), a pioneering Navy nurse who served as Superintendent of the U.S. Navy Nurse Corps during World War I.

Ingalls Shipbuilding was awarded the contract for Lenah Sutcliffe Higbee in June 2013 and began fabrication of the vessel in January 2017.  The ship's keel was laid in a ceremony at the Ingalls shipyards on 14 November 2017. She was christened on 24 April 2021 in Pascagoula, Mississippi, and delivered to the Navy on 30 November 2022.

See also
 , another ship named for Lenah Higbee.

References

 

Arleigh Burke-class destroyers
2020 ships